Singer Aretha Franklin has been honored with many awards and nominations. These include 18 Grammy Awards and an additional 26 Grammy nominations for her recordings.

Grammy Awards
Franklin was nominated for a Grammy Award 44 times and was the award winner 18 times. Eleven of her albums were nominated, winning four times.

Grammy Special Awards

American Music Awards

Critics' Choice Movie Awards

Golden Globe Awards

MTV Video Music Awards

NAACP Image Awards

TV Land Awards

Other honors

See also
List of best-selling music artists
List of Rock and Roll Hall of Fame inductees

References

Franklin
Awards